The 2002–03 Austrian Cup was the 69th season of Austria's nationwide football cup competition. It commenced with the matches of the First Round in August 2002 and concluded with the Final on 1 June 2003. The competition was won by Austria Vienna after beating FC Kärnten 3–2. Due to Austria Vienna qualifying for European competition through winning the Bundesliga, Kärnten qualified for the 2003–04 UEFA Cup as cup runners-up.

First round

| colspan="3" style="background:#fcc;"|
 
 
 
 
 
 
 
 

 

 
 
 
 
 

 
 
 
 
 
 

|}

Second round

| colspan="3" style="background:#fcc;"|

 
 
 
 
 
 
|-
| colspan="3" style="background:#fcc;"|
 

|-
| colspan="3" style="background:#fcc;"|

|-
| colspan="3" style="background:#fcc;"|
 
|}

Third round

| colspan="3" style="background:#fcc;"|

|-
| colspan="3" style="background:#fcc;"|
 
 
|}

Quarter-finals

| colspan="3" style="background:#fcc;"|

|-
| colspan="3" style="background:#fcc;"|

|}

Semi-finals

| colspan="3" style="background:#fcc;"|

|}

Final

References

External links
 Austrian Cup 2002-2003
 RSSSF page

Austrian Cup seasons
2002–03 in Austrian football
Austrian Cup, 2002-03